The 2011 Giro di Padania was the first edition of the Giro di Padania cycling stage race. It started on 6 September in Paesana and ended on the 10th in Montecchio Maggiore.

More than 200 riders and 25 teams participated in the race, including the ProTour teams Liquigas–Cannondale, Lampre–ISD and Astana, and the national teams of Australia, Poland and Slovenia. Among the riders who took part to the race there were the 2006 and 2010 Giro d'Italia winner Ivan Basso, the 2011 Milano-Sanremo winner Matthew Goss, the Italian Road Race Champion Giovanni Visconti, the 2000 Giro d'Italia winner Stefano Garzelli, and the classic specialist Davide Rebellin.

The race was won by Liquigas–Cannondale rider Ivan Basso, who claimed the leader's green jersey after winning the fourth stage.

In the race's other classifications, Liquigas–Cannondale rider Elia Viviani won the Points and the Intermediate Sprints classifications, Simone Campagnaro of D'Angelo & Antenucci–Nippo won the light blue jersey for the King of the Mountains classification, Astana's Francesco Masciarelli, who was third in the General classification, won the Young Rider classification, with Androni Giocattoli finishing at the head of the Teams classification.

Race overview

Final standings

General Classification

Points Classification

King of the Mountains Classification

Sprints Classification

Young Rider Classification

Controversy
This edition was heavily disrupted by activists who stated that the race was intended as political Propaganda for the Lega Nord political party. The idea of organising the race was announced by Lega Nord's leader Umberto Bossi in September 2010  and, according to the protesters, the race itself was full of references to the Padanian nationalism, such as the choice of green colour for the leader's jersey. Moreover, the race is organized by the society Monviso-Venezia, whose president, Michelino Davico, is a Lega Nord's senator.

During second stage, in Savona, Ivan Basso and Sacha Modolo had been slapped and insulted by protesters.

References

2011 UCI Europe Tour
2011 in Italian sport